Khalifa Lahej (Arabic:خليفة لاحج) (born 4 April 1994) is an Emirati footballer. He currently plays for Al-Arabi as a winger .

External links

References

Emirati footballers
1993 births
Living people
Al-Wasl F.C. players
Al Shabab Al Arabi Club Dubai players
Masfout Club players
Al Dhaid SC players
Al-Arabi SC (UAE) players
UAE First Division League players
UAE Pro League players
Association football midfielders